Twenty Four Hours is a 1960 painted steel sculpture by Sir Anthony Caro, located in Tate Britain, central London, England. It was purchased by Tate in 1975.

The sculpture is important in the history of British sculpture since it is Caro's first abstract sculpture and his first welded sculpture. It was previously owned by the American art critic Clement Greenberg, who Caro met, along with abstract painters such as Kenneth Noland, during a visit to the United States in 1959. The sculpture is constructed out of found pieces of steel.

This sculpture was previous exhibited at the Whitechapel Art Gallery (September–October 1963), UCLA Art Galleries (Los Angeles, 1963), Washington Gallery of Modern Art (February–March 1965), and the Hayward Gallery (January–March 1969).

References

External links
 Sir Anthony Caro – Twenty Four Hours 1960 video, 26 January 2005

1960 sculptures
Sculptures by Anthony Caro
Sculptures of the Tate galleries
Steel sculptures in England